The Treaty of Amsterdam, officially the Treaty of Amsterdam amending the Treaty on European Union, the Treaties establishing the European Communities and certain related acts, was signed on 2 October 1997, and entered into force on 1 May 1999; it made substantial changes to the Treaty of Maastricht, which had been signed in 1992.

Under the Treaty of Amsterdam, member states agreed to transfer certain powers from national governments to the European Parliament across diverse areas, including legislating on immigration, adopting civil and criminal laws, and enacting  common foreign and security policy (CFSP), as well as implementing institutional changes for expansion as new member nations join the EU.

Background
The treaty was the result of long negotiations which began in Messina, Italy, on 2 June 1995, nearly forty years after the signing of the Treaty of Rome, and reached completion in Amsterdam on 18 June 1997. Following the formal signing of the Treaty on 2 October 1997, the member states engaged in an equally long and complex ratification process. The European Parliament endorsed the treaty on 19 November 1997, and after two referendums and 13 decisions by parliaments, the member states finally concluded the procedure.

Contents
The Treaty of Amsterdam comprises 13 protocols, 51 declarations adopted by the Conference, and eight declarations by member states, plus amendments to the existing treaties set out in 15 articles. Article 1 (containing 16 paragraphs) amends the general provisions of the Treaty on European Union and covers the CFSP and cooperation in criminal and police matters. The next four articles (70 paragraphs) amend the EC Treaty, the European Coal and Steel Community Treaty (which expired in 2002), the Euratom Treaty, and the Act concerning the election of the European Parliament. The final provisions contain four articles. The new treaty also set out to simplify the Community Treaties, deleting more than 56 obsolete articles and renumbering the rest in order to make the whole more legible. By way of example, Article 189b on the codecision procedure became Article 251.

The most pressing concerns of ordinary Europeans, such as their legal and personal security, immigration, and fraud prevention, were all dealt with in other chapters of the treaty. In particular, the EU became responsible for legislating on immigration, civil law or civil procedure, insofar as this is necessary for the free movement of persons within the EU. At the same time, intergovernmental co-operation was intensified in the police and criminal justice field so that member states should be able to coordinate their activities more effectively. The Union aims to establish an area of freedom, security and justice for its citizens. The Schengen Agreements have now been incorporated into the legal system of the EU (the Republic of Ireland remains outside the Schengen agreement due to its relationship with the United Kingdom, see Common Travel Area for details).

The treaty lays down new principles and responsibilities in the field of the common foreign and security policy, with the emphasis on projecting the EU's values to the outside world, protecting its interests, and reforming its modes of action. The European Council will lay down common strategies, which will then be put into effect by the Council acting by a qualified majority, subject to certain conditions. In other cases, some member states may choose to abstain "constructively", i.e. without actually preventing actions being taken.

The treaty introduced a High Representative for EU Foreign Policy who, together with the Presidents of the Council and the European Commission, puts a "name and a face" on EU policy to the outside world. Although the Amsterdam Treaty did not provide for a common defence, it did increase the EU's responsibilities for peacekeeping and humanitarian work, in particular by forging closer links with Western European Union.

Institutions 
As for the institutions, there were two major reforms concerning the co-decision procedure (the legislative procedure involving the European Parliament and the council), affecting its scope—most legislation was adopted by the co-decision procedure—and its detailed procedures, with the parliament playing a much stronger role. The President of the commission will also have to earn the personal trust of the parliament, which will give him the authority to lay down the commission's policy guidelines and play an active part in choosing the Members of the commission by deciding on their appointment by common accord with the national governments. These provisions make the Commission more politically accountable, particularly vis-à-vis the European Parliament. Finally, the new Treaty enables, under very strict conditions, closer co-operation between member states which so wish. Closer co-operation may be established, on a proposal from the commission, in cases where it is not possible to take joint action, provided that such steps do not undermine the coherence of the EU or the rights and equality of its citizens.

Challenges
The Amsterdam Treaty did not settle all institutional questions. Work was still in progress on reforming the institutions to make them capable of operating effectively and democratically in a much enlarged EU. The most pressing issues were the composition of the commission and the weighting of member states' votes upon qualified majority voting. These questions were addressed in the Treaty of Lisbon.

Signatures

Withdrawal
On 31 January 2020, the United Kingdom left the European Union and so withdrew from the treaty.

EU evolution timeline

See also
Common Travel Area
Enhanced cooperation
Schengen Treaty

References

External links

 The Amsterdam Treaty - official site
 The Amsterdam treaty: a comprehensive guide
 Full text of the Amsterdam Treaty
 The Treaty on European Union (as amended by the Treaty of Amsterdam - pdf 203Kb) 
 The Treaty establishing the European Community (as amended by the Treaty of Amsterdam - pdf 488Kb) 
 The History of the European Union - The Treaty of Amsterdam
 European Disability Forum: Guide to the Amsterdam Treaty (Single page)
 The Amsterdam Summit in retrospect: Maastricht II and corporate lobby successes (UNICE)
  The Amsterdam Treaty - How Industry Got Its Way(ERT)
 Amsterdam Treaty European NAvigator

Amsterdam
Treaties concluded in 1997
Treaties entered into force in 1999
1997 in the European Union
1999 in the European Union